Latrodectus apicalis, known as the Galapagos black widow, is endemic to the Galápagos Islands. Like many black widow spiders, it has a red or orange hourglass-shaped spot on the underside of the abdomen. It is venomous and sometimes hard to find.

References

apicalis
Endemic fauna of the Galápagos Islands
Spiders of South America
Spiders described in 1877